Jean Alfonsetti (10 January 1908 – 2 July 1984) was a Luxembourgian cyclist. He competed in the individual and team road race events at the 1928 Summer Olympics.

References

External links
 

1908 births
1984 deaths
Luxembourgian male cyclists
Olympic cyclists of Luxembourg
Cyclists at the 1928 Summer Olympics
People from Remich (canton)